Salt Creek may refer to:

Streams
Salt Creek (Amargosa River tributary), California
Salt Creek (Orange County), California
Salt Creek (Sacramento River tributary), California
Salt Creek (Salton Sea), California
Salt Creek (Des Plaines River tributary), Illinois
Salt Creek (Little Wabash River tributary), Illinois
Salt Creek (Sangamon River tributary), Illinois
Salt Creek (Little Calumet River tributary), Indiana
Salt Creek (White River tributary), Indiana
Salt Creek (Osage River), Missouri
Salt Creek (Platte River), Nebraska
Salt Creek (Muskingum County, Ohio), a stream located entirely within Muskingum County, Ohio
Salt Creek (Middle Fork Willamette River tributary), Oregon
Salt Creek (Juab County), Utah

Settlements
Salt Creek, Colorado
Salt Creek, Oregon
Salt Creek, South Australia
Salt Creek, Panama, a village on Bastimentos Island, Panama

Other
 Salt Creek (2015), a novel by Australian author Lucy Treloar
 Salt Creek Bay, on which Edithburgh is located, in South Australia
Salt Creek Canyon massacre, June 4, 1858 massacre in Salt Creek Canyon, Utah 
Salt Creek Oil Field, located in Natrona County, Wyoming. 
Salt Creek pupfish, another name for the Death Valley pupfish
Salt Creek Township (disambiguation)

See also
Salt River (disambiguation)